The Assembly of Deputies of the Nenets Autonomous Okrug is the regional parliament of the Nenets Autonomous Okrug, a federal subject of Russia. It consists of 19 deputies who are elected for five-year terms.

Powers
 Receives district Charter and amendments
 Carries out legislative regulation of subjects of conducting the district and the joint jurisdiction of the Russian Federation and the Russian Federation within the district office
 Hears annual reports of the head of the district administration about its activities and the activities of the district administration
 Exercise other powers established by the Constitution, federal laws, the Charter and laws of the Nenets Autonomous Okrug.

Elections

2018

References

Politics of Nenets Autonomous Okrug
Nenets